SS Coylet was a WWI A-class standard cargo ship built by Laing James & Sons Ltd of Sunderland, United Kingdom for the Shipping Controller, London as War Rambler. in 1918. She was built of steel and powered by a three cylinder triple expansion steam engine with a single shaft and one screw.

On 15 February 1922 she caught fire and after her crew were rescued by the  she was shelled and sunk by the U.S. Coast Guard, 12 nautical miles (22 km) west south west of the Sand Key Lighthouse, Florida, United States.  Her owner at the time of her scuttling was Thomas Dunlop & Sons.

References

1917 ships
Ships built on the River Wear